Johny Jaminet (25 April 1930 – 11 September 1999) was a Luxembourgian footballer. He competed in the men's tournament at the 1952 Summer Olympics.

References

External links
 

1930 births
1999 deaths
Luxembourgian footballers
Luxembourg international footballers
Olympic footballers of Luxembourg
Footballers at the 1952 Summer Olympics
Sportspeople from Esch-sur-Alzette
Association football defenders